The year 1701 in music involved some significant musical events and new works.

Events 
Georg Philipp Telemann matriculates in law at the University of Leipzig.  In the same year, he meets George Frideric Handel for the first time.
Founding of the Slovenian Philharmonic Society (orchestra)
In a competition held in Dorset Gardens, London, for the best musical setting of the masque 'The Judgement of Paris' by William Congreve, John Weldon emerges victorious, with John Eccles second and Daniel Purcell third.
The semi-opera Acis and Galatea, with music by John Eccles and text by Peter Anthony Motteux, is staged in London.
Domenico Scarlatti is appointed organist and composer of the vice-regal court in Naples

Published popular music 
"Captain Kidd"

Classical music 
Giovanni Henrico Albicastro – XII Suonate a tre, due violini et violoncello col basso per l'organo
Tomaso Albinoni – 12 Balletti de Camera, Op. 3
Carlo Ambrogio Lonati – 12 Violin Sonatas
Giovanni Bononcini  
La conversione di Maddalena
Duetti da camera, Op.8
 Michel Richard Delalande – Venite exultemus Domino, S.58
Charles Dieupart – 6 Suittes
Gottfried Finger – 10 Recorder Sonatas, Op.3
Johann Joseph Fux – Concentus Musico-Instrumentalis, Op.1
Louis Heudelinne – 3 Suites, Livre 1
Giuseppe Maria Jacchini – Concerti per camera a 3. e 4. strumenti, Op.4
Marin Marais  
Domine salvum fac regem (lost)
Pièces de viole, Livre II
 Carlo Antonio Marino – 12 Sonatas, Op.6
Georg Muffat  
"Auserlesene Instrumentalmusik" (Selected Instrumental Music)

 Sybrandus van Noordt – Sonate per il cimbalo appropriate al flauto & violino
 Johann Christoph Pez – 12 Sonatas 'Duplex Genius''', Op.1
 Michelangelo Rossi – Toccata No.14 in C major Alessandro Scarlatti – Tu sei quella che al nome, H.743
 Domenico Scarlatti – Antra, valles, divo plaudant montes colles Johann Schenck – Scherzi musicali, Op.6
 George Philipp Telemann – Ach Herr, strafe mich nicht, TWV 7:3
Tomaso Antonio Vitali – Concerto di sonate a violino, violoncello e cembalo, Op.4

 Opera 
Antonio Caldara Costanza in amor vince l'inganno (Includes arias "Selve Amiche" and "Sebben, Crudele")La PartenopeAndre Campra – Hésione (final revised version)
Theobaldo di Gatti – ScyllaReinhard Keiser – Störtebecker und Jödge MichaelsTomás de Torrejón y Velasco – La púrpura de la rosaTheoretical writingsJohan Georg Ahlens musikalisches Winter-Gespräche by Johann Georg Ahle, on intervals and modes. This is the fourth and final part of Ahle's Musikalische Gespräche series of treatises in form of dialogues.Dictionnaire de musique by Sébastien de Brossard.Principes d'acoustique et de musique by Joseph Sauveur

 Births 
January 10 – Johann Caspar Simon, organist and composer (died 1776)
February 1 – Johan Agrell, German composer and violinist (died 1765)
June 19 – François Rebel, French composer (died 1775)
September 22 – Anna Magdalena Bach, second wife of Johann Sebastian Bach, to whom he dedicated several of his works (died 1760)

 Deaths 
February 15 – Adam Drese, composer and bass viol player (b. c.1620)
March 10 – Johann Schelle, composer (b. 1648
October 13 – Andreas Anton Schmelzer, composer (b. 1653)probable''
Carolus Hacquart, composer (b. c.1640)
Servaes de Koninck, composer (b. c.1654)

References

 
18th century in music
Music by year